A Common Goal is an American Christian punk band, and they primarily play punk rock and alternative rock. They come from Boston, Massachusetts. The band started making music in 2009, and their members are lead vocalist and guitarist, Mike May, lead guitarist and background vocalist, Scott Grenon, bassist and background vocalist, Brett Ennis, and drummer and background vocalist, Jason Autrey. The band have released one extended play, For God and Country, in 2013, with Thumper Punk Records. Their first studio album, Blessings and Battles, was released in 2013 by Thumper Punk Records.

Background
A Common Goal is a Christian punk band from Boston, Massachusetts. Their members are lead vocalist and guitarist, Mike May, lead guitarist and background vocalist, Scott Glenon, bassist and background vocalist, Brett Ennis, and drummer and background vocalist, Jason Autrey.

Music history
The band commenced as a musical entity in 2009 with their release, For God and Country, an extended play, that was released by Thumper Punk Records on March 29, 2013. They released, a studio album, Blessings and Battles, on May 1, 2013, with Thumper Punk Records.

Members
Current members
 Mike May - lead vocals, guitar
 Scott Grenon - guitar, background vocals
 Brett Ennis - bass, background vocals
 Jason Autrey - drums, background vocals

Discography
Studio albums
 Blessings and Battles (May 1, 2013, Thumper Punk)
EPs
 For God and Country (March 29, 2013 Thumper Punk)

References

External links
Facebook page

Musical groups from Boston
2009 establishments in Massachusetts
Musical groups established in 2009